Artur Zaczek (born 28 February 1989) is a Polish athlete specialising in the sprinting events. He won a bronze medal in the 4 × 100 metres relay at the 2009 European U23 Championships in addition to three medals won in the same event at the Summer Universiades between 2009 and 2015. He was also an unused reserve runner at the 2012 Summer Olympics, as well as the 2011 and 2013 World Championships.

International competitions

1Did not finish in the final

Personal bests
Outdoor
100 metres – 10.47 (+1.6 m/s, Szczecin 2012)
200 metres – 20.76 (+0.9 m/s, Gdańsk 2015)
Indoor
60 metres – 6.75 (Vienna 2013)
200 metres – 21.48 (Spała 2010)

References

1989 births
Living people
Polish male sprinters
Universiade medalists in athletics (track and field)
People from Łomża
Universiade silver medalists for Poland
Universiade bronze medalists for Poland
Medalists at the 2009 Summer Universiade
Medalists at the 2013 Summer Universiade
Medalists at the 2015 Summer Universiade
21st-century Polish people